The Sama language, Sinama (Sama + the infix -in-; also known as Bahasa Bajau), is the language of Sama-Bajau people of the Sulu Archipelago, Philippines; Sabah, Malaysia and parts of Indonesia. The Sama are one of the most widely dispersed peoples in Southeast Asia.

Classification
The Ethnologue divides Sinama into seven languages based on mutual intelligibility. The seven Sinama languages are Northern Sinama, Central Sinama, Southern Sinama, Sinama Pangutaran from the island of Pangutaran off of Jolo island, Mapun, Bajau West Coast of Sabah and Bajau Indonesia.  Jama Mapun, a language from the island of Mapun, formerly known as Cagayan de Sulu, is a related language and sometimes also referred to as Sinama.  These classifications are rarely recognized by Sama themselves who instead classify their Sinama by the village or island it originates from.  The emic classification of a Sama person's language e.g. Silumpak, Laminusa, Tabawan generally form the different dialects of the seven Sinama or Bajau languages.

Dialects

The following list of Sama dialects is from Ethnologue, with some additions from Pallesen (1985) (individual languages with separately assigned ISO codes highlighted in bold; locations and speaker populations are from Palleson (1985:45-50)):

Inabaknon: Capul Island, off the coast of northwestern Samar, central Philippines
Yakan: eastern Basilan Island, southern Zamboanga Peninsula. 60,000 speakers.
Northern Yakan: northern part of eastern Basilan Island
Southern Yakan: southern part of eastern Basilan Island
Pangutaran Sama (Western Sulu Sama branch)
Sama Pangutaran: Pangutaran Island, 50 km northwest of Jolo City. 12,000 speakers. Some live in Palawan
Sama Ubihan: North Ubian Island, a few miles southwest of Pangutaran. 2,000 speakers. Also called a'a ubian, a'a sowang buna 'people of Buna' channel'.
Inner Sulu Sama branchNorthern Sama''' (Northern Sulu in Pallesen (1985))Lutangan (Lutango): mainland of Mindanao opposite Olutanga Island
Sibuco-Vitali (Sibuku’): inland area across the Zamboanga Peninsula, 50 km north of Zamboanga City. 11,000 speakers. Also called sama bitali', sama nawan.
Sibuguey (Batuan): Kulasihan River on the eastern side of Sibuguey Bay between Olutanga Island and the head of the bayBalangingiDaongdung (Sama Daongdong): Daongdong Island, off the southeast coast of Jolo IslandKabinga’anTagtabun Balangingi’: Tagtabun Island, just east of Zamboanga City. Regular population of 300 as of 1972. Also called bahasa bāngingi' (bāngingi', a'a tagtabun).Tongquil Balangingi’: Tongquil Island in the Samales group, east of Jolo Island. 8,000 speakers. Also called sama tongkil.Linungan: Linungan (Linongan) or Cocos Island, off the northeast coast of Basilan IslandPanigayan Balangingi’: Malamawi Island, just off the west coast of Basilan Island. Several hundred speakers. Also called bahasa balangingi' (sama bāngingi').Landang-Gua’: Sakol or Landang Island, just east of Zamboanga City, north of Tagtabun Island. Also called a'a landang-gua ('Landang-Gua’ people').
Mati: Mati, Davao Oriental, just east of the San Agustin Peninsula
Kawit Balangingi’: Kawit, 10 km west of Zamboanga City
Karundung: Karundung, on the southeast coast of Jolo Island
Pilas: Pilas Island|Pilas Group, 15 km west of Basilan IslandCentral SamaSama Deya
Sama Dilaut: throughout Sulu, but especially in Zamboanga City, in Siasi, and in Sitangkai, south of Tawi-Tawi Island. 80,000 speakers in the Philippines. Also called sama to'ongan 'genuine Sama'; sama pagūng 'floating Sama'; sama pala'u 'boat-dwelling Sama'.
Sama Siasi
Sama Laminusa: Laminusa Island, just off the north coast of Siasi Island. 5,000 speakers.
Sama Tabawan
Sama Kaulungan: Kaulungan Island, just off the eastern end of Basilan Island. At least 1,000 speakers.
Sama Musu’: south coast of Siasi Island. 3,000 speakers. Intermarriage with Sama Dilaut. Also called Sama Lipid (Littoral Sama) by the Sama Dilaut (Sea Sama).
Sama Balimbing: Balimbing, on the east coast of Tawi-Tawi Island (listed as part of Southern Sama in Ethnologue)
Sama Bannaran: Bannaran Island, Sapa-Sapa, Tawi-Tawi.
Sama Bangaw-Bangaw: near Sandakan on the northeast coast of Sabah
South Ubihan: South Ubian Island, east of the northeast end of Tawi-Tawi Island. Census figure of 27,000, including the population of Tandubas.Southern SamaSibutu’ (Sama Sibutu): Sibutu’ Island, southwest of Bongao Island. About 10,000 speakers.
Simunul: Simunul Island, south of Bongao Island. 10,000 speakers. Also called sama səddopan.
Tandubas (Tandu’-baas): Tandubas Island,  just of the northeastern point of Tawi-Tawi Island. Census figure of 27,000, including the population of Tandubas. Also called a'a tandu'-bās 'people of Tandu-Bas', a'a ungus matata 'people of Ungus Matata'. The Sama of central Sulu call them obian, ubian, sama s'ddopan 'Southern Sama'.
Obian
Bongao
Sitangkai
Languyan
Sapa-Sapa
Sama Pahut: Bongao Island. About 1,000 speakers.
Sama Sampulna’: Semporna, east Sabah
Berau, East Kalimantan about 46,000 speakers.Mapun: 43,000 in the Philippines; 15,000 Mapun people in Sabah, Malaysia (2011 SIL)
Mapun is spoken on Cagayan de Sulu (Mapun) island, Tawi-Tawi, Philippines.
20,000 in Mapun island
5,000 to 10,000 Mapun people in PalawanBajau West Coast SabahKota Belud
Tuaran
KudatBajau IndonesiaGorontalo Torosiaje,_Popayato,_Pohuwato

Distribution
Ethnologue provides the following location information for various Sama languages.Northern Sama is located in western Mindanao, the Sulu archipelago northeast of Jolo, Zamboanga coast peninsula and islands, and Basilan island.
Northern Sama dialect: White Beach near Subic Bay, Luzon
Lutangan dialect: Olutanga Island. Possibly also in Luzon and Palawan.Central Sama is located in:
Sulu and Tawi-Tawi provinces: Siasi, Tabawan, Bongao, Sitangkai, Cagayan de Sulu island
Basilan Island: Maluso, Malamawi, Bohe’ Lobbong
Zamboanga del Sur Province: Rio Hondo, Batuan Lumbayaw, Taluk Sangay, [Sanggali
Zamboanga del Norte Province: Olutanga
Davao City: Isla Verde and Sasa
Cagayan de Oro
Cebu and Tagbilaran
Puerto Princesa, Palawan
BatangasSouthern Sama is located in Tawi-Tawi Island Province (in Tawi-Tawi, Simunul, Sibutu, and other major islands) and East Kalimantan (Berau)Pangutaran Sama is spoken on Pangutaran Island, located to the west of Jolo; and in Cagayan de Tawi-Tawi, southern PalawanYakan is spoken in Basilan and small surrounding islands; Sakol island; and the eastern coast of Zamboanga. Yakan tends to be concentrated away from the coast.Inabaknon is spoken on Capul Island, Northern Samar Province. Capul Island is located in the San Bernardino Strait, which separates Samar from the Bicol Peninsula of Luzon.Bajau West Coast Sabah is spoken in Kota Belud, Kudat, and Tuaran which is on mutual intelligibility with Bajau East Coast of Sabah.Bajau Indonesia' is spoken on some part of Indonesia, Torosiaje island.

Phonology
thumb|This woman making a traditional mat is a Sama from Siasi who now lives in Semporna, Malaysia.Sinama languages have 21 to 24 phonemes.  All Sinama languages have 17 consonants.  Each language has from five to seven vowels.

Consonants

The consonants of the Sinama languages are represented by the letters b, d, g, h, j, k, l, m, n, ng, p, r, s, t, w, y and '.

Representation of the glottal stop in Sinama has not yet reached a consensus among Sinama speakers.  Linguists have suggested the use of an apostrophe-like character for word final glottal stops.  Central Sinama has adopted this for glottal stops in between vowels as well (i.e. , the Sinama word for 'human').  Other Sinama languages have chosen to follow Tagalog orthography and to leave this vowel medial glottal stop ambiguous.  Sinama speakers often spell the word final glottal stop with an h at the end.  Sinama speakers in Malaysia may also spell it with a  following the vowel softening patterns of Bahasa Melayu.

In certain dialects of Sinama  becomes  and  becomes  when found between two vowels.

Vowels
The vowels a, e, i, o, u are found in all Sinama languages and dialects.  In addition to these five vowels ə, and ɤ are found in one or more Sinama language.

Many of the Sinama languages have contrastive vowel lengthening.  This is represented by a macron over the vowel.

Stress
Sinama pronunciation is quite distinct from other nearby languages such as Tausug and Tagalog in that all of the Sinama languages primary stress occurs on the penultimate syllable of the word.  Stress will remain on the penultimate syllable even with the addition of suffixes including enclitic pronouns.  In Northern Sinama (Balanguingi') the stress will shift to the ultima when the penult is the mid central vowel .

Enclitic pronouns
The 1st, 2nd, and 3rd singular pronouns -ku, -nu and -na respectively, the 1st plural inclusive pronouns -ta and -tam, as well as the 2nd plural pronoun -bi are all enclitics. These enclitic pronouns change the pronunciation by shifting the stress of a word through the addition of a syllable; a verb or noun combined with a suffixed one syllable enclitic pronoun.  Some Sinama orthographies represent this by writing both noun/verb and pronoun as one word e.g.  for 'our house' in Central Sinama.  Other orthographies represent this with a hypen e.g.  for 'our house' in Southern Sinama.  Still others write this keeping the noun/verb separate from the prounoun e.g. luma' ta for 'our house' in Northern Sinama.

Cultural references
The lyrics of the song called Kiriring Pakiriring (popularly known as Dayang Dayang) were written in the Simunul dialect of the Southern Sinama language.

Central Sinama and Southern Sinama are two of six languages used in the 2012 Filipino drama film, Thy Womb.

Sinama is featured on the 1991 edition of the Philippine one thousand peso bill.  Langgal is written under a picture of a Sama place of worship.  Langgal'' is the Sinama for that place of worship.

Further reading

References

Sama–Bajaw languages
Languages of Sulu
Languages of Basilan
Languages of Tawi-Tawi
Languages of Sabah
Languages of Malaysia
Languages of the Philippines
Languages of Indonesia